Gillette A. Elvgren (March 15, 1914 – February 29, 1980) was an American painter of pin-up girls, advertising and illustration. Best known for his pin-up paintings for Brown & Bigelow, Elvgren studied at the American Academy of Art. He was strongly influenced by the early "pretty girl" illustrators, such as Charles Dana Gibson, Andrew Loomis, and Howard Chandler Christy. Other influences included the Brandywine School founded by Howard Pyle.

Biography
Gillette A. Elvgren was born in St. Paul, Minnesota, and attended University High School. After graduation, he began studying art at the Minneapolis Institute of Arts. He subsequently moved to Chicago to study at the American Academy of Art. He graduated from the Academy during the depression at the age of 22. Elvgren joined the stable of artists at Stevens and Gross, Chicago's most prestigious advertising agency. He became a protégé of the artist Haddon Sundblom.

In 1937, Gil began painting calendar pin-ups for Louis F. Dow, one of America's leading publishing companies, during which time he created about 60 works on 28 × 22 in canvas and distinguished them with a printed signature. Many of his pin-ups were reproduced as nose art on military aircraft during World War II. Circa 1944, Elvgren was approached by Brown and Bigelow, a firm that still dominates the field in producing calendars and advertising specialties. He was associated with Brown & Bigelow from 1945 to 1972. At Brown & Bigelow Elvgren began working with 30 × 24 in canvases, a format that he would use for the next 30 years, and signed his work in cursive.

Elvgren was a commercial success. He lived in various locations, and was active from the 1930s to 1970s. In 1951 he began painting in a studio in his home, then in Winnetka, Illinois, using an assistant to set up lighting, build props and scenes, photograph sets, and prepare his paints. His clients ranged from Brown and Bigelow and Coca-Cola to General Electric and Sealy Mattress Company. During the 1940s and 1950s he illustrated stories for many magazines, such as The Saturday Evening Post and Good Housekeeping. Among the models Elvgren painted were Myrna Hansen, Donna Reed, Barbara Hale, Arlene Dahl, Lola Albright and Kim Novak.

See also
 Pin-up girl
 List of pin-up artists

Notes

Sources
 Martignette, Charles G. and Louis K. Meisel, The Great American Pin-Up (Taschen America, LLC; 2002). 
 Martignette, Charles G. and Louis K. Meisel, Gil Elvgren: All His Glamorous American Pin-Ups (Taschen America, LLC; 2008). 

1914 births
1980 deaths
Artists from Saint Paul, Minnesota
Pin-up artists
American illustrators
20th-century American painters
American male painters
American erotic artists
20th-century American male artists